A Horse and Two Goats and Other Stories (also published as A Horse and Two Goats) is a collection of short stories by R. K. Narayan, published in 1970 by The Bodley Head. The book is illustrated by R. K. Laxman, Narayan's brother, and includes five stories. The title story is a sly narrative of a business transaction between an American tourist and an Indian goat-herder as Muni, the result of an inability to communicate with each other.

References

Short story collections by R. K. Narayan
1970 short story collections
The Bodley Head books
Interpreting and translation in fiction